Saint John Regional School is a Roman Catholic primary school in Concord, New Hampshire serving approximately 250 students in prekindergarten through eighth grade.

The school's motto is "fides, caritas, veritas", translated as "faith, charity, truth"

References

External links 
 Official website

Schools in Concord, New Hampshire
Private elementary schools in New Hampshire
Private middle schools in New Hampshire
Christian schools in New Hampshire